Svetlana Afanasyevna Svetlichnaya (born 15 May 1940) is a Soviet and Russian actress most famous for her role in The Diamond Arm (1968).

Biography
She was born in the city of Leninakan (now Gyumri), Armenian SSR, Soviet Union on 15 May 1940 to Afanasy Mikhailovich Svetlichnyi and Maria Feodorovna Zolotareva. During World War II the family lived in the town of Kolomak in the Kharkiv Oblast, then moved to the city Okhtyrka in the Sumy Oblast. Her father was in the military, and the family followed her father to his place of service. They lived in Ukraine and Austria, and at the age of 10 Svetlana lived on the Baltic coast, in the city of Sovetsk, Kaliningrad Oblast. When Svetlana graduated from high school, her mother sent her to Moscow by a train. There Svetlana went to the Gerasimov Institute of Cinematography (VGIK).

At VGIK, she studied under Mikhail Romm, and his combined directing-acting course. Under this course, she studied Valery Spout, Zhanna Prokhorenko, Galina Polskikh, Andron Konchalovsky, and Andrei Smirnov. On stage, she played a student Elisabetta Procter in Salem's process, Katyusha Maslova in Resurrection, and Maryanka in Cossacks. After her role of Anna Sergeyevna in The Diamond Arm, her phrase It's not my fault! He came by himself! became one of the most popular in the Soviet Union.

Selected films
Thirty Three (1965)
The Cook (1965)
The Diamond Arm (1968)
The New Adventures of the Elusive Avengers (1968)
Seventeen Moments of Spring (1973) [Television series]
Father Sergius (1978)
Anna Pavlova (1983)
Day of Wrath (1985)
House on a Rock (1994)
Goddess: How I fell in Love (2004)
The Girl and Death (2012)

References

External links

1940 births
Living people
People from Gyumri
Soviet film actresses
Russian film actresses
A Just Russia politicians
21st-century Russian politicians
Gerasimov Institute of Cinematography alumni